Dhani, or Dhanni, is a group of Western Punjabi dialects spoken in parts of Rawalpindi Division (Pothohar) of Pakistani Punjab. They are spoken throughout a widespread area, including Chakwal and Jhelum Districts, as well as in neighbouring Attock District.
Its name is derived from Dhan valley where its spoken. The closely related dialect Sohāī̃ is spoken in the Fateh Jang Tehsil of Attock District.

Classification

In the 1920s G.A. Grierson in his Linguistic Survey of India called this group North-Western Lahnda.
Jatki language is a common name for the Jhangvi dialect, Shahpuri dialect and Dhani dialect. 
The glotlog codes for these are:
 shah1266
 jatk1238 
 jang1253
 dhan1272

Dialect speaking areas
Chakwal district of Punjab Province of Pakistan and neighboring districts speak this dialect.

Chakwal District
Choa Saidanshah
Jhelum District (in southern parts)
Attock District (in southern parts)

References

Bibliography

Further reading 

Languages of Punjab, Pakistan
Punjabi dialects